Mameliella is a genus in the phylum Pseudomonadota (Bacteria). The name Mameliella derives from: New Latin feminine gender dim. noun Mameliella, arbitrary name derived from the acronym MMEL, marine microbial ecology laboratory.

Species
The genus contains a single species, namely M. alba ( Zheng et al. 2010, (Type species of the genus).; Latin feminine gender adjective alba, white.)

See also
 Bacterial taxonomy 
 Microbiology

References 

Rhodobacteraceae
Bacteria genera
Monotypic bacteria genera